Typically for Eastern European countries, Bulgarian banking sector is characterized by relatively small size, small number of banks with wide business focus, high degree of concentration and high share of foreign capital.

The most commonly used ratio to measure the size of a banking sector, namely the ratio of consolidated banking assets to gross domestic product, for Bulgaria shows that its banking sector is roughly the same size as its national economy (the ratio is 107.09%). Most of the banks operating in Bulgaria are universal banks providing products and services in retail and corporate banking. Although there are no pure direct banks in Bulgaria, several banks offer their products via the Internet.

Bulgaria is also part of the Single Euro Payments Area (SEPA).

The following is a list of banks in Bulgaria.

Central bank

 Bulgarian National Bank

Development banks

 Bulgarian Development Bank

Commercial banks
Аll amounts are in BGN thousand.

References 

 

Bulgaria
 
Banks
Bulgaria